Luca Sartori (born 19 July 1971) is an Italian former rower. He competed in the men's coxless four event at the 1992 Summer Olympics.

References

External links
 

1971 births
Living people
Italian male rowers
Olympic rowers of Italy
Rowers at the 1992 Summer Olympics
People from Terracina
Sportspeople from the Province of Latina
World Rowing Championships medalists for Italy